Fiamma may refer to:

Fiamma, an Italian name
Galvano Fiamma (1283–1344), Italian Dominican and chronicler of Milan
Gabriele Fiamma (1533–1585), Roman Catholic prelate who served as Bishop of Chioggia
Fiamma Ferragamo (1941–1998), Italian businessperson and shoe designer
Fiamma Nirenstein (born 1945), Italian-Israeli journalist, author and politician
Fiamma Smith (born 1962), Guatemalan alpine skier
Fiamma (footballer) (born 2004), Spanish footballer
Trebbiano della Fiamma, Italian wine grape
Movimento Sociale Fiamma Tricolore, neo-fascist political party in Italy
La fiamma, opera in three acts by Ottorino Respighi
La misteriosa fiamma della regina Loana, novel by the Italian writer Umberto Eco
Fiamma of the Right, fictional character from A Certain Magical Index light novel, manga and anime series
A.S.D. Fiamma Monza 1970, women's football team based in Monza, Lombardy, Italy
Fiamma che non si spegne, 1949 Italian war drama film
Bella mia fiamma, addio, concert aria by Wolfgang Amadeus Mozart
Fiamma Fumana, Italian world music ensemble
La fiamma sul ghiaccio, 2006 Italian drama film